The Journal of Genocide Research is a quarterly peer-reviewed academic journal covering studies of genocide. Established in 1999, for the first six years it was not peer-reviewed. Since December 2005, it is the official journal of the International Network of Genocide Scholars. Previous editors have been Henry R. Huttenbach, Dominik J. Schaller, and Jürgen Zimmerer. The journal is abstracted and indexed in Political Science Abstracts, Historical Abstracts, and America: History and Life. As of 2021, the journal is published by Routledge and the editor-in-chief is A. Dirk Moses (University of Sydney).

Controversies 
Israel Charny published an article titled "Holocaust Minimization, Anti-Israel Themes, and Antisemitism: Bias at the Journal of Genocide Research". His allegations were rejected by contributors to the Journal of Genocide Research.

References

External links
 
 International Network of Genocide Scholars
Holocaust Memorial Day Trust

Political science journals
History journals
Academic journals about the Holocaust
International relations journals
Publications established in 1999
Taylor & Francis academic journals
Quarterly journals
English-language journals
Genocide research and prevention organisations